The University of Wisconsin–River Falls (UWRF) women's ic hockey team competes at the  Division III level as part of the National Collegiate Athletic Association (NCAA). They finished in the top four in 2003, 2009, 2014, 2015.

History
The team was established in the year 2000, with Joe Cranston as the first head coach. The Falcons are a part of the Wisconsin Intercollegiate Athletic Conference (WIAC), which was once a part of the Northern Collegiate Hockey Association (NCHA). However, the WIAC announced in February 2012 that they would be leaving the NCHA due to budgetary reasons, effective for the 2014–15 season. The Falcons have currently joined the WIAC for the most recent seasons. The Falcons have not won a national title, but have made appearances in the NCAA tournament in the years: 2003, 2009, 2010, 2011, 2012, 2013, 2014, 2015. The Falcons home arena is Hunt Arena, which opened in 1973 and is still home of the Falcons hockey teams. Cranston is currently the head coach of the Falcons, which have made three NCAA Frozen Four appearances since the program was established.

Accomplishments 
NCAA national championships: 2003, 2009, 2010, 2011, 2012, 2013, 2014, 2015
NCHA Champions: 2003, 2009, 2010, 2012
WIAC Champions: 2013, 2014, 2015
NCAA 3rd Place: 2014, 2015
NCAA 2nd Place: 2016

Coaching

References

External links
National Ranks
NCAA History
Joe Cranston's Bio
UWRF Women's Hockey
WIAC

Ice hockey teams in Wisconsin
Ice Hockey, Women